Rapaka Vara Prasada Rao is an Indian politician. He was elected to the Andhra Pradesh Legislative Assembly from Razole in the 2019 Andhra Pradesh Legislative Assembly election as a member of the Jana Sena Party and in the 2009 Andhra Pradesh Legislative Assembly election as a member of the Indian National Congress. He was the only member elected from the Jana Sena Party in 2019 Andhra Pradesh Assembly election.

References

1958 births
Living people
Jana Sena Party politicians
Indian National Congress politicians from Andhra Pradesh
People from East Godavari district
Andhra Pradesh MLAs 2019–2024